Selo imeni M. Gorkogo is a rural locality (a selo) in Ullubiyevsky Selsoviet, Tarumovsky District, Republic of Dagestan, Russia. The population was 284 as of 2010. There are 5 streets.

Geography 
Selo is located 13 km southeast of Tarumovka (the district's administrative centre) by road. Karabagly is the nearest rural locality.

References 

Rural localities in Tarumovsky District